The Kawasaki KX80 was a 80cc(79cc-82cc) eduro style offroad motorbike, introduced in 1979 and ended production in 2000. It is a single cylinder, lquid cooled 2 stroke running at 32:1 fuel ratio with a wet clutch, 6 speed transmission. Unpretentious and inclusive, this small, powerful two-wheeler boasted an advertised 20hp, a 13-inch ground clearance, 75-mph(121 km/h) top speed stock. Uses 10w-40 wet clutch oil as crank case oil. There are big wheel and small wheel bikes to fit shorter and taller kids safely, and more comfortably.

References

KX80
Off-road motorcycles
Motorcycles introduced in 1988
Two-stroke motorcycles